Kapitanov may refer to
Iliyan Kapitanov (born 1992), Bulgarian football player
Kapitanov ključ, a novel by Slovenian author Ivan Sivec